"Bilādī, laki ḥubbī wa fuʾādī" ("My homeland, you have my love and my heart"), also known by its incipit, "", is the national anthem of Egypt, composed by Sayed Darwish and written by Mohamed Yunis El Qadi. It was adopted in 1979.

History 

The lyrics were written by Mohamed Younis El Qady and Sayed Darwish composed the music and maintained close ties with early leaders of the national movement for independence in Egypt, such as Mustafa Kamel. In fact, the chorus of Egypt's national anthem was derived from one of Kamel's most famous Egyptian nationalist speeches.

Egypt's first national anthem dated back to 1869 when a royal anthem was composed to honor the monarch. It is unclear how long this anthem was in use. Although the monarchy was deposed in 1952, the anthem was used as part of the anthem of the United Arab Republic with Syria in 1958.

Lyrics

See also 
 List of national anthems

Notes

References 
General
 
Specific

External links 
 
 Instrumental version of "Bilady, Bilady, Bilady" in RealAudio

	

National Anthems of Egypt
Bilday Bilady Bilady 
National anthem compositions in F major
Egyptian patriotic songs